John McLure House, also known as the Hans Phillips House, Lawrence Sands House, and Daniel Zane House, is a historic home located on Wheeling Island at Wheeling, Ohio County, West Virginia. It was built between 1853 and 1856 [when the island was a part of Virginia], and is a three-story, Federal-style brick dwelling.  A two-story rear addition was built before 1870. A semi-circular columned portico and two-story, projecting side bay, were added in the late 19th century and added Classical Revival elements to the home.

A "widow's walk" was placed on the roof sometime after McLure's death. It was the home of Captain John McLure (1816-1893), an American steamboat master, boatbuilder, and capitalist.

It was listed on the National Register of Historic Places in 1991.  It is located in the Wheeling Island Historic District.

References

Houses in Wheeling, West Virginia
Houses on the National Register of Historic Places in West Virginia
Federal architecture in West Virginia
Neoclassical architecture in West Virginia
National Register of Historic Places in Wheeling, West Virginia
Individually listed contributing properties to historic districts on the National Register in West Virginia